The 304th Expeditionary Airlift Squadron is a provisional United States Air Force unit.  It is assigned to the 13th Air Expeditionary Group, based at Hickam Air Force Base, Hawaii.

Mission
The 304th operates the Boeing C-17 Globemaster III airlifter in support of Joint Task Force-Support Forces Antarctica (JTF-SFA).  The squadron provides the bulk of the air resupply between New Zealand and Antarctica. It also provides intercontinental transport of personnel and cargo to and from the United States.

The squadron consists of aircraft and personnel deployed to New Zealand from the 62d and 446th Airlift Wing at Joint Base Lewis-McChord, Washington.

History

World War II
The squadron was first activated as the 304th Troop Carrier Squadron in September 1943 under I Troop Carrier Command and equipped with Douglas C-47 Skytrains.   It trained in various parts of the eastern United States until early 1944.  The squadron deployed to England and became part of IX Troop Carrier Command.

The unit prepared for the invasion of Nazi-occupied Europe. It began operations by dropping paratroops of the 101st Airborne Division in Normandy on D-Day on 6 June 1944 and releasing gliders with reinforcements on the following day. The unit received a Distinguished Unit Citation and a French citation for these missions.  After the Normandy invasion the squadron ferried supplies in the United Kingdom.

After moving to France in September, the unit dropped paratroops of the 82nd Airborne Division near Nijmegen and towed gliders carrying reinforcements during Operation Market Garden. the airborne attack on the Netherlands. In December, it participated in the Battle of the Bulge by releasing gliders with supplies for the 101st Airborne Division near Bastogne.

When the Allies made the air assault across the Rhine River in March 1945, each aircraft of the squadron towed two gliders with troops of the 17th Airborne Division and released them near Wesel. The squadron also hauled food, clothing, medicine, gasoline, ordnance equipment, and other supplies to the front lines and evacuated patients to rear zone hospitals. It converted from C-47s to Curtiss C-46 Commandos and used the new aircraft to transport displaced persons from Germany to France and Belgium after V-E Day.  It was inactivated in Germany in September 1946.

Reserve and mobilization for the Korean War
Postwar the squadron was activated in the air force reserve in 1949 at Fairfax Field, Kansas, operating Curtiss C-46 Commandos. It was called to active duty and activated during the Korean War in 1951. Its aircraft and personnel were used as fillers for active duty units, and the squadron was inactivated.

Reactivation in the reserve
The unit reformed in the reserve in 1952, moving to Richards-Gebaur Air Force Base near Kansas City in 1955.  Conducted routine reserve training operating Douglas C-124 Globemaster IIs flying worldwide transport missions beginning in 1961.  The squadron was called to active duty due to the Berlin Crisis of 1961, but returned to reserve service in the late summer of 1962.

The squadron converted to the Lockheed C-130 Hercules aircraft on 27 October 1971.  It routinely flew airlift support missions to the Pacific region and Southeast Asia from 1964 until 1972. It was inactivated on 30 June 1974 when personnel and equipment was merged into the 303d Tactical Airlift Squadron.

Awards and decorations
 Campaigns: World War II: Rome-Arno; Southern France; Normandy; Northern France; Rhineland; Central Europe.
 Decorations: Distinguished Unit Citation: France, [6-7] Jun 1944. Air Force Outstanding Unit Award: 1 Aug 1967-25 Oct 1968. Republic of Vietnam Gallantry Cross with Palm: 1 Apr 1966-19 May 1972.

Lineage
 Constituted as the 304th Troop Carrier Squadron on 25 May 1943
 Activated on 1 September 1943
 Inactivated on 30 September 1946
 Redesignated 304th Troop Carrier Squadron, Medium' on 10 May 1949
 Activated in the reserve on 27 June 1949
 Ordered into active service on 10 March 1951
 Inactivated on 12 March 1951
 Activated in the reserve on 15 June 1952
 Inactivated on 26 July 1955
 Activated in the reserve on 16 November 1957
 Redesignated 304th Troop Carrier Squadron, Heavy on 8 May 1961
 Ordered into active service on 1 Oct 1961
 Relieved from active duty on 27 August 1962
 Redesignated 304th Air Transport Squadron, Heavy  on 1 December 1965
 Redesignated 304th Military Airlift Squadron on 1 January 1966
 Inactivated on 30 June 1974
 Redesignated 304th Expeditionary Airlift Squadron and converted to provisional status on 27 March 2003
 Activated on 15 August 2003
 Inactivated on 1 March 2004
 Activated on 15 August 2004
 Inactivated on 28 February 2005
 Activated 29 July 2005
 Inactivated c. 28 February 2006
 Activated 2007

Assignments
 442d Troop Carrier Group, 1 September 1943 – 30 September 1946
 442d Troop Carrier Group, 27 June 1949 – 12 March 1951
 442d Troop Carrier Group, 15 June 1952 – 26 July 1955
 442d Troop Carrier Group, 16 November 1957
 442d Troop Carrier Wing, 14 April 1959
 936th Troop Carrier Group (later 936th Air Transport Group, 936th Military Airlift Group, 936th Tactical Airlift Group), 17 January 1963 – 30 June 1974
 Air Mobility Command to activate or inactivate at any time after 27 Mar 2003
 500th Air Expeditionary Group, 15 August 2003 – 1 March 2004
 Attached to 715th Air Mobility Operations Group, 15 August 2004 – 28 February 2005
 500th Air Expeditionary Group, 29 July 2005 – c. 28 February 2006
 Attached to: 13th Air Expeditionary Group, 1 October 2007

Stations

 Sedalia Army Air Field, Missouri, 1 September 1943
 Alliance Army Air Field, Nebraska, 15 December 1943
 Pope Field, North Carolina, 26 January 1944
 Baer Field, Indiana, 2–8 March 1944
 RAF Fulbeck (AAF-488), England, 27 March 1944
 RAF Weston Zoyland (AAF-447), England, 12 June 1944 (operated from Follonica Airfield, Italy, 18 July – 24 August 1944)
 Saint-André-de-l'Eure Airport (B-24), France, 5 November 1944 (operated from Metz Airfield (Y-34), France, 21 April – 15 May and 26 May – 10 September 1945)

 AAF Station Munich (R-82), Germany, September 1945 – 30 September 1946
 Fairfax Field, Kansas, 27 June 1949
 Olathe Naval Air Station, Kansas, 27 May 1950 – 12 March 1951
 Olathe Naval Air Station, Kansas, 15 June 1952
 Grandview Air Force Base (later Richards-Gebaur Air Force Base), Missouri, 3 April 1955 – 30 June 1974
 Christchurch, New Zealand, 15 August 2003 – 1 March 2004
 Christchurch, New Zealand, 15 August 2004 – 28 February 2005
 Christchurch, New Zealand, 29 July 2005 – c. 28 February 2006
 Hickam Air Force Base, Hawaii, 1 October 2007 – present

Aircraft

 Douglas C-47 Skytrain, 1943-1946; 1949-1950
 Waco CG-4A Glider, 1944-1945
 C/TC-46 Commando, 1949, 1950-1951, 1952-1955

 Fairchild C-119 Flying Boxcar, 1957-1961
 Douglas C-124 Globemaster II, 1961-1971
 Lockheed C-130 Hercules, 1971-1974
 Boeing C-17 Globemaster III, when active since 2003

References

Notes
 Explanatory notes

 Citations

Bibliography

External links 
 Joint Task Force–Support Forces Antarctica Factsheet
 13th Air Expeditionary Group adopts new emblem

Airlift squadrons of the United States Air Force